The Journal of Maternal-Fetal and Neonatal Medicine is a peer-reviewed medical journal that covers obstetric, medical, genetic, mental health, and surgical complications of pregnancy and their effects on the mother, fetus, and neonate. Research on audit, evaluation, and clinical care in maternal-fetal and perinatal medicine is also featured.  It is the official journal of the European Association of Perinatal Medicine, the Federation of Asia and Oceania Perinatal Societies, and the International Society of Perinatal Obstetricians.

Editors 
The Editors-in-Chief of the Journal of Maternal-Fetal and Neonatal Medicine are Gian Carlo Di Renzo (Santa Maria della Misericordia University Hospital, Perugia, Italy)  and Dev Maulik (University of Missouri at Kansas City School of Medicine).

References 

Publications established in 1992
Pediatrics journals
Obstetrics and gynaecology journals